Plumaria may refer to:
 a synonym for Eriophorum, a plant genus
 Plumaria (alga), a red algae genus in the family Wrangeliaceae
 The pre-Hispanic artistic practice of using feathers in artwork, particularly headdresses in Latin America, most prominently Mexico (see Mexican featherwork)